Atif Attarwala (born 15 October 1992) is an Indian cricketer. He made his Twenty20 debut on 11 November 2019, for Mumbai in the 2019–20 Syed Mushtaq Ali Trophy. He made his List A debut on 21 February 2021, for Mumbai in the 2020–21 Vijay Hazare Trophy.

References

External links
 

1992 births
Living people
Indian cricketers
Mumbai cricketers